Paolo Renda (September 10, 1939 – disappeared May 20, 2010, later declared dead September 2, 2018) was an Italian-Canadian consigliere of the Rizzuto crime family based in Montreal, Quebec, Canada, who has not been seen since May 2010.

Biography
Renda was born on September 10, 1939, in Cattolica Eraclea, Sicily. He immigrated to Canada in 1954 and married Vito Rizzuto's sister Maria on September 5, 1964. In 1972, Renda was sentenced to four years for conspiring to commit arson of his hair salon in Boucherville in 1968 with the intention of defrauding insurers; he served two years and nine months of the sentence. Shortly after the murder of Paolo Violi in 1978, an arrest warrant was issued for Renda, who subsequently fled to Venezuela but returned to Montreal when the warrant was dismissed. He then became a consigliere for the Rizzuto family.

Renda was arrested on November 22, 2006, along with dozens of others including Nicolo Rizzuto, Rocco Sollecito, Francesco Arcadi, Lorenzo Giordano and Francesco Del Balso, as part of Project Colisée. In September 2008, Renda pleaded guilty to two counts of possessing profits from organized crime. He was released on parole in February 2010.

Disappearance
On May 20, 2010, Renda went golfing in the morning and then went to a funeral home owned by his family in Saint-Leonard. He then phoned his wife to say he would be picking up steaks for dinner. After not arriving home by 15:00 ET, Renda's son-in-law decided to search for him by tracing his usual route and found Renda's vehicle parked with its windows down and keys in the ignition, with Renda nowhere to be seen. Renda is believed to have been kidnapped.

Renda's disappearance is believed to be part of a vendetta for the murders of brothers Paolo and Franceso Violi of the Bonanno crime family, who were both murdered in the 1970s. Renda's disappearance occurred almost a year after Nicolo Rizzuto's grandson Nicolo was murdered, and six months after his disappearance, Nicolo would be murdered at his home.

Renda's family tried to have Paolo legally pronounced dead in 2013, though a judge turned down the request due to insufficient proof. On September 2, 2018, it was reported that the courts had declared Renda dead.

See also
List of people who disappeared

References

1939 births
2010s missing person cases
2018 deaths
Canadian gangsters of Sicilian descent
Consiglieri
Italian emigrants to Canada
Missing gangsters
Missing person cases in Canada
Gangsters from the Province of Agrigento
Organized crime in Montreal
People convicted of arson
People convicted of fraud
People declared dead in absentia
People from Cattolica Eraclea
Rizzuto crime family
Sicilian mafiosi